The 2012 Austin mayoral election was held on May 12, 2012 to elect the mayor of Austin, Texas. It saw the reelection of incumbent mayor Lee Leffingwell.

Due to a shift in the following 2014 election from mayoral elections from being held every three years to being held every four years in United States midterm election years, this was an election to an abbreviated term.

Election results

References

2012 Texas elections
2012 United States mayoral elections
2012
Non-partisan elections